The 1927 Providence College football team was an American football team that represented Providence College as an independent during the 1927 college football season. In their third year under head coach Archie Golembeski, the team compiled a 1–4–2 record.

Schedule

References

Providence
Providence Friars football seasons
Providence College football